Realism is the ninth studio album by American indie pop band The Magnetic Fields. It was officially released on January 26, 2010 by Nonesuch Records.

Content 

Described by songwriter Stephin Merritt as his "folk album", the instrumentation of Realism is largely acoustic, stark in contrast to the band's previous album, Distortion, released in 2008. Merritt said he "thought of the two records as a pair" and considered titling the albums True and False, but ultimately could not decide which title would correspond with which album. The song "The Dada Polka" is the only track to feature an electric guitar. Merritt also avoided using a traditional drum kit, further separating the sound of Realism from the noise pop of Distortion. Along with Distortion and the 2004 album i, Realism was also recorded without the use of synthesizers, completing the band's "no-synth trilogy".

Joshua Rifkin, who arranged the Judy Collins albums In My Life and Wildflowers, was cited by Merritt as a creative influence for Realism.

Track listing

Personnel
The Magnetic Fields
Stephin Merritt – vocals, instrumentation
Claudia Gonson – vocals, piano, tablas, cajon, leaves
Sam Davol – cello
John Woo – banjo, cuatro, sitar
Shirley Simms – vocals, violin

Additional personnel
Johny Blood – flugelhorn, tuba, vocals
Daniel Handler – accordion, vocals
Ida Pearle – violin

References

External links
 The House of Tomorrow
 Realism at Nonesuch Records

2010 albums
Nonesuch Records albums
The Magnetic Fields albums